Trierische  Landeszeitung (TLZ) is a German newspaper issued from 1875 (originally as Katholische Volkszeitung) to 1974.

References

Defunct newspapers published in Germany